STATPHYS is an international conference on statistical physics of the International Union of Pure and Applied Physics (IUPAP).  The series of conferences take place every three years in a different continent to give the maximum international relevance and visibility to the event.  It is the world event for the broad field of statistical physics and all its interdisciplinary developments.  The first meeting was in Florence (Italy) from 17 to 20 May 1949.  After a pioneering period the periodicity of three years was established and the conference has acquired more and more importance.  The participation has reached peaks up to 1500 participants in the recent years.  Also on the occasion of this conference the prestigious Boltzmann medal is awarded.  In addition several satellite meetings are usually held along with the main event, adding to the scientific value of the meeting.

Recent meetings:

 STATPHYS17, Rio de Janeiro, Brazil, July 31-August 4, 1989 
 STATPHYS18, Berlin, Germany, August 2–8, 1992 
 STATPHYS19, Xiamen, China, July 31–August 4, 1995 
 STATPHYS20, Paris, France, July 20–24, 1998, 
 STATPHYS21, Cancun, Mexico, July 15–21, 2001, 
 STATPHYS22, Bangalore, India, July 4–9, 2004, 
 STATPHYS23, Genova, Italy, July 9–13, 2007 
 STATPHYS24, Cairns, Australia, July 19–23, 2010 
 STATPHYS25, Seoul, Korea, July 22–26, 2013 
 STATPHYS26, Lyon, France, July 18–22, 2016 
 STATPHYS27, Buenos Aires, Argentina, July 8–12, 2019 
 STATPHYS28, planned to be held in Tokyo, Japan, 2023 
 STATPHYS29, planned to be held in Florence, Italy, 2025

International conferences